Love Symbol is the fourteenth studio album by American recording artist Prince, and the second of two that featured his backing band the New Power Generation. It was released on October 13, 1992, by Paisley Park Records and Warner Bros. Records. It was originally conceived as a "fantasy rock soap opera" with various spoken segues throughout (with its storyline becoming the basis for Prince's direct-to-video film 3 Chains o' Gold), and contains elements of R&B, funk, pop, rock, and soul.

The official title of the album is an unpronounceable symbol depicted on its cover art, which Prince copyrighted under the title "Love Symbol #2", and adopted as his stage name from 1993 to 2000 to protest his treatment by Warner Bros. Records (which had refused to steadily release his back catalog of unreleased music, and trademarked his given name for promotional purposes). The release has been referred to under titles such as Love Symbol, Symbol Album, or Symbol.

Its first two singles, "Sexy MF" and "My Name Is Prince", achieved modest success on the US pop chart, though both made the top ten in the United Kingdom. Conversely, the third single, "7", was not as successful in the United Kingdom, but was a top ten hit in the United States.

Storyline
An early configuration of the album contained as many as eight segues as well as an intro. Together, they explained the album's storyline: An Egyptian princess (played by Mayte Garcia, in her debut on a Prince album) falls in love with a rock star (Prince) and entrusts him with a religious artifact, the Three Chains of Turin (or Three Chains o' Gold) during her escape from seven assassins, as referenced in "7". However, in a last-minute attempt to add an additional song ("I Wanna Melt with U", which was originally considered to be a B-side to the "7" maxi single, and which contains several sampled sounds also present in "7"), most of the segues had to be cut for album length. The few that remained were somewhat confusing in context. The unreleased segues have been bootlegged since. Garcia would become Prince's wife in 1996.

On the released album, the segues featuring Kirstie Alley as reporter Vanessa Bartholomew are mostly kept intact. In them, she attempts to interview Prince but fails; at first, he hangs up when being told he is being recorded, but in a later segue, Prince gives nonsense answers to Vanessa's requests. A few lines in which Vanessa inquires about the Three Chains of Turin was edited out of the final version.

3 Chains o' Gold, a direct-to-video film produced and directed by Prince, was released in 1994. The film is based on the storyline and songs of the Love Symbol Album and contains some of the original segues which were planned to be on the album.

Marketing 
Warner Bros. Records pushed for "7" to be released as the album's first single. However, Prince pushed for "My Name Is Prince" to serve as lead single, as he felt that its hip-hop sound would appeal better to listeners that had enjoyed his previous album Diamonds and Pearls. "Sexy MF" would ultimately serve as the album's lead single.

Critical reception

The Love Symbol Album was voted the 14th best record of 1992 in the Pazz & Jop, an annual poll of American critics nationwide, published by The Village Voice. Robert Christgau, the poll's creator, later wrote of the album: "Designed to prove his utter inexhaustibility in the wake of Diamonds and Pearls, by some stroke of commerce his best-selling album since Purple Rain, this absurdly designated 'rock soap opera' (is he serious? is he ever? is he ever not?) proves mainly that he's got the funk."

Track listing
All tracks written by Prince, except where noted; all tracks arranged and produced by Prince and The New Power Generation.

Every use of the pronoun "I" throughout the song titles and liner notes is represented by a stylized "👁" symbol. Prince fans commonly transliterate this symbol as "Eye".

Special editions
Several editions of this album were released. Early pressings of the album featured an embossed gold love symbol on the jewel case, sometimes matte, sometimes glossy. Later editions feature it printed on the booklet or not present at all. A Special Limited Edition Gold Box CD was released with a purple love symbol engraved in the golden box. One boxed set came with a bonus "Sexy MF" CD single, another with a specially created CD single of "My Name Is Prince" mixes.

Early configuration
Below is the early version of the album with all the original segues. "The Sacrifice of Victor" is slightly longer on the early configuration.

 "Intro"
 "My Name Is Prince"
 "Sexy MF"
 "Segue"
 "Love 2 the 9's"
 "The Morning Papers"
 "The Max"
 "Segue"
 "Blue Light"
 "Segue"
 "Sweet Baby"
 "Segue"
 "The Continental" 
 "Damn U"
 "Segue"
 "Arrogance"
 "The Flow"
 "Segue"
 "7"
 "Segue"
 "And God Created Woman"
 "3 Chains o' Gold"
 "Segue"
 "The Sacrifice of Victor"

Personnel
Prince and The New Power Generation
 Prince – vocals, guitars, keyboards, bass, drums, percussion
 Mayte – vocals
 Tony M. – raps
 Damon Dickson – dancer
 Levi Seacer, Jr. – guitars
 Tommy Barbarella – keyboards
 Sonny T. – bass
 Michael Bland – drums
 Kirk Johnson – percussion
Additional personnel
 Carmen Electra – guest rap on "The Continental"
 The Steeles (Jevetta, Jearlyn, JD and Fred Steele) – backing vocals on "The Sacrifice of Victor"
 Kirstie Alley plays frustrated reporter Vanessa Bartholomew in the two included segue tracks
 Eric Leeds – saxophone on "Blue Light"
 Michael Koppelman – bass on "Blue Light"
 DJ Graves – scratching 
 Mike Nelson, Brian Gallagher, and Steve Strand – horns
 Airiq Anest – programming
 Clare Fischer – string arrangements

Production
 Arranged by Prince and The New Power Generation
 Produced by Prince and The New Power Generation; additional production by Keith Cohen; additional production on "I Wanna Melt with You" by George Black; strings produced by Clare Fischer
 Recorded by Michael Koppelman, Dave Friedlander, Steve Noonan, Ray Hahnfeldt and Brian Poer; strings recorded by Larry Mann; Kirstie Alley's voice recorded by Peter Arata
 Mixed by Keith Cohen, Michael Koppelman, Tom Garneau, Bob Rosa and Steve Beltran; additional mixing by Dave Aron, Airiq Anest, Steve Durkee, Biran Poer, Steve Noonan and Ray Hahnfeldt
 Mastered by Brian Gardner and Steve Noonan

Publishing
 All songs published by Controversy Music/WB Music Corp.; except:
 Track 1 (Copyright NPG Music/Michael Anthony Music), track 15 (NPG Music) 
 Track 12 (Controversy Music/WB Music Corp; contains a sample of "I Know You Got Soul" by Eric B. & Rakim which is published by Songs of Polygram International Inc./Robert Hill Music; contains a sample of "Jazz It Up" originally by C.F.M. Band and also a sample of "Niggaz 4 Life" by N.W.A; copyright Ruthless Attack Muzik/Sony Songs/Bridgeport Music).
 Track 14 published by Controversy Music; additional publishing by Powerforce Music/Budget Music; sample of "Tramp" by Lowell Fulsom published by Blues Interactions, Inc.

Singles
 "Sexy MF" maxi-single (#66 US, #76 US R&B, #4 UK)
 "My Name Is Prince" maxi-single (#36 US, #25 US R&B, #7 UK)
 "7" maxi-single (#7 US, #3 US R&B, #27 UK)
 "Damn U" (#105 US, #32 US R&B)
 "The Morning Papers" maxi-single (#44 US, #8 US R&B, #52 UK)

Charts

Certifications

Notes

References

External links
 Love Symbol Album at Discogs
 Revisiting the Love Symbol Album after 25 years at MTV

1992 albums
Albums produced by Prince (musician)
Concept albums
Paisley Park Records albums
Prince (musician) albums
Warner Records albums
Albums arranged by Clare Fischer